Helene Montreuil or Micheline Montreuil (born June 1952) is a Canadian lawyer, teacher, writer, radio host, trade unionist and politician.

As a transgender woman, she first became known for her legal struggles in front of the Canadian Human Rights Tribunal, the Superior Court and the Court of Appeal in Quebec. She is also known for her involvement as a politician.

From 1986 to September 9, 2016, she used the first name of Micheline as she was known as Micheline Montreuil. Since September 9, 2016, she uses only the first name of Helene and she is now known under the name of Helene Montreuil.

In the following text, the first names Helene and Micheline are used depending about the time, the circumstances and the context. This text is a translation from the French page where you can find many external links, but mainly in French.

Biography 
Helene Montreuil is born in 1952 in the city of Quebec, town of her family since 1637 and always her residence town. She is the daughter of Louis Papineau Montreuil and Lina Chicoine and she is the grand daughter of Yves Montreuil, public notary in Quebec city and of Leonie Papineau, on father's side, and of Georges Alfred Chicoine and Mary Lapointe, on mother's side. She is the third child of a four children's family : Louise, Georges, Helene and Jean.

Helene Montreuil studied civil law at University Laval, common law at University of Manitoba and University of Ottawa, management at University Laval, industrial relations at University of Paris I - Pantheon-Sorbonne, and finally, ethics and education at the University of Quebec in Rimouski.

She works mainly as a lawyer since 1976 and as a professor of law, management and ethics since 1978.

On September 13, 2003, she married the lawyer and author Michèle Morgan at the Quebec City Palais des arts. The wedding was largely covered by the newspapers and the television.

In 2006-2007, she worked as a lawyer at the Conseil de la justice administrative du Québec.

Since 2007, she is back as a lawyer in private practise and teacher of ethics, law and management at the UQAR, the Université du Québec à Rimouski.

She has written many books in law and management:
 1986 - Droit des affaires
 1990 - Organisation et dynamique de l'entreprise» en collaboration
 1991 - Initiation au droit commercial
 1993 - Organisation et dynamique de l'entreprise - Approche systémique, en collaboration
 1994 - Le droit, la personne et les affaires 
 2012 - Les affaires et le droit 
2020 - Les affaires et le droit, 2e édition
Her wife, Michele Morgan, has written nine books about happiness and the life after death:
 Pourquoi pas le bonheur ? 
 Les Clés du bonheur  
 Dialogue avec l'âme sœur  
 Petits Gestes et Grandes Joies 
 Le Goût d'être heureux 
 Le Courage d'être heureux 
 Suivre le courant et découvrir l’essentiel de sa vie 
 La Belle de l'Au-delà 
Isabelle  
In 1986, she began to use the first name « Micheline ».

Legal fights 

In 1997, she begin a legal challenge against the Registrar of Civil Status of Quebec as she had not been permitted to legally change her name to Micheline. Following a Court of Appeals ruling, her request was finally accepted in 2002, but only for the name Micheline. She was obliged to gain one by one all her first names: Anne in 2008 and Hélène in 2011. (See Legal aspects of transsexualism.)

Anyway, on May 13, 1998, Helene Montreuil decided to live only as a woman under the name «Micheline Montreuil».

In 1998, the National Bank of Canada refused to hire Micheline Montreuil. In a judgment given on February 5, 2004, the Canadian Human Rights Tribunal ruled that the National Bank of Canada had discriminated against her on the basis of her gender identity, despite the bank attributing it to over-qualification.

Few years later, in a judgment given on November 20, 2007, the Canadian Human Rights Tribunal ruled that the Canadian Forces Grievance Board had discriminated against her on the basis of her gender identity.

Since September 9, 2016, she uses only the name «Helene Montreuil».

References

External links 
 Official website of Micheline Montreuil, the transgender
Articles in newspapers about the wedding of Micheline Montreuil
 Official website of Me Helene Montreuil, lawyer
 Official website of Mrs Helene Montreuil
Official website of Helene Montreuil

Lawyers in Quebec
Canadian LGBT politicians
Living people
Politicians from Quebec City
LGBT lawyers
Transgender politicians
Transgender women
Transgender writers
Transgender academics
Canadian women in federal politics
Women in Quebec politics
Canadian women lawyers
1952 births
Canadian LGBT academics